Makis Tsitas (born 1971) is a Greek writer. He was born in Yiannitsa and went to university in Thessaloniki. To date, Tsitas has published a novel, a short story collection, and more than a dozen books for children. His debut novel God Is My Witness was published in 2013, and won the EU Prize for Literature.

Tsitas' work has been translated into several European languages, including German, Spanish, English, Hebrew, Swedish and Finnish. He lives in Athens.

Background 
Makis Tsiitas born in Yiannitsa and majored in Journalism and cooperated with several radio stations in Thessaloniki. As of 1994 he resides permanently in Athens and works in publishing. He has served as Senior Editor for the literary magazine Periplous (1994-2005), and was the Co-publisher and Director of the journal for the book Index (2006-2011). Ever since 2012 he has been directing Diastixo.gr, a website on books and culture. He is also a member of the Administrative Council of the Hellenic Authors’ Society. His literary works have been included in anthologies, published in magazines and newspapers, and translated into several European languages, including German, French, Spanish, English, Hebrew, Albanian, Swedish, Finnish, and Italian. Some of his works have also been staged and directed by Ersi Vasilikioti (“Theatro ton Keron”), Sophia Karagianni (“Vault Theater”), Taru Makela (Christine and Goran Schildt Foundation, Finland), Alexandru Mazgareanu (“Nottara Theater,” Romania). His lyrics have been put to music by Giorgos Stavrianos, Takis Soukas, and Tatiana Zografou. He has published twenty books for children and three for adults. His novel God Is My Witness, has earned him the 2014 European Union Prize for Literature and honors by the Municipalities of Athens, Pella, and Edessa, the Central Public Library of Edessa, as well as the Region of Central Macedonia. God Is My Witness is already available in 12 European languages.

Books
For adults
 
 
 

For kids

Honorary Events and Ceremonies 
 European Union Prize for Literature (2014)
 Honorary Event from Municipality of Pella (2015)
 Honorary Event from  City of Athens (2015)
 Honorary Event from municipality of Edessa (2016)
 Honorary Event from Region of Central Macedonia (2016)
 Honorary Event from Central Public Library of Edessa (2016)

References

Greek writers
1971 births
Living people